Rabindranath Tagore Medical College, also known as  RNT Medical College,  is a government medical college situated in the city of Udaipur in the Indian state of Rajasthan.

History
The college was established in 1961, in a building donated by His Highness ex-Maharana of Udaipur. The administrative block is housed in another historical palace donated by Salumber Rao. The college received recognition from the Medical Council of India in 1966. The college is named after the famous Indian Nobel Laureate Rabindranath Tagore, a writer and freedom fighter.

Academics

The admission to the M.B.B.S. course is highly competitive. Students who have graduated from high school with Physics, Chemistry and Biology as core subjects can appear for the UG admission test. The medical college offers 250 seats in M.B.B.S. course, 92 in post-graduate degree courses, 12 in post-graduate diploma courses, and two seats in the DM Cardiology course.

15% of total M.B.B.S. seats are filled through the All India counselling conducted by the Medical Counselling Committee (MCC) and 4% seats are reserved for the Government of India nominees from the North-Eastern states. The remaining seats are filled through state level counselling conducted by the Office of the Chairman, NEET UG Medical and Dental Admission/Counselling Board and Principal & Controller, SMS Medical College and Hospital, Jaipur. Starting in 2013, undergraduate admissions is through the National Eligibility cum Entrance Test (NEET-UG).

50% of seats in each post-graduate specialty are filled through the All India Post Graduate Medical Entrance Examination and the remaining through Rajasthan Pre-PG Examination. The institute offers post-graduate degree courses in Preventive and Social Medicine, Pathology, Ophthalmology, ENT, General Medicine, General Surgery, Obstetrics and Gynecology, Pediatrics, Anesthesiology, Orthopedics, Radiodiagnosis/Radiology, Radiotherapy, Psychiatry, Tuberculosis and Respiratory Diseases, and Dermatology. Post-graduate diploma courses are offered in Anesthesiology, Pediatrics, and Obstetrics and Gynecology.

DM Cardiology seats are filled through the Super Specialty Entrance Examination conducted by the Rajasthan University of Health Sciences, Jaipur.

The following hospitals are attached to the college:
Maharana Bhupal Government Hospital
Pannadhaya Janana Hospital
Seth Ramvilas Bhuwalaka Yakshma Arogya Sadan, Badi
Baal Chikitsalaya Unit
Hindustan Zinc Ltd. Cardiology Unit
RSMML Cardiothoracic Unit
Trauma Unit

References

Medical colleges in Udaipur
Medical colleges in Rajasthan
Memorials to Rabindranath Tagore
Colleges in Udaipur
Educational institutions established in 1961
1961 establishments in Rajasthan
Affiliates of Rajasthan University of Health Sciences